Iain Macnab of Barachastlain (21 October 1890 – 24 December 1967) was a Scottish wood-engraver and painter.

As a prominent teacher he was influential in the development of the British school of wood-engraving. His pictures are noted for clarity of form and composition.

His concepts of the sense of motion which could be created by the shape of repetitive parallel lines were of profound influence, in particular in relation to the art of linocut – an art form which both he and Claude Flight pioneered at the Grosvenor School of Modern Art where with the teachers included Cyril Power and Sybil Andrews.

His work was shown in the British pavilion at the Venice Biennale of 1930.

Biography
Iain Macnab was born in Iloilo in the Philippines on 21 October 1890 to Scottish parents, the son of John Macnab of the Hongkong and Shanghai Bank. The family moved to Scotland when he was young.

Macnab served in France in the First World War as a captain in the Argyll and Sutherland Highlanders. He was severely wounded as a machine-gun officer, invalided out and spent two years in bed recovering from his wounds. He rejoined the military in the Second World War, despite his age, and became a pilot officer in the Royal Air Force Volunteer Reserve. He was again wounded and invalided twice, in 1942 and 1945.

He married the dancer Helen Wingrave.

Macnab was educated at Merchiston Castle School in Edinburgh before studying at Glasgow School of Art and then at Heatherley’s in 1918. From 1919 to 1925 he was principal of Heatherley’s School of Art.

In 1925 he became the founding principal of the Grosvenor School of Modern Art.

Macnab was hereditary armourer and standard bearer to the Macnab of Macnab.

Macnab died in London on 24 December 1967. His younger sister Chica Macnab was also an artist.

Published works
 Reprinted 1973, Norwood Editions, USA 
 Revised second edition 1940 
 Reprinted 1947
 Wood-engravings by Iain Macnab

Public collections
Works by Macnab are in the following public collections:
British Museum
Kelvingrove Art Gallery, Glasgow
Victoria and Albert Museum, London
Ashmolean Museum, Oxford
Fitzwilliam Museum, Cambridge
British Council 
 UK Government Art Collection
Government of Canada
Government of New Zealand

Arts organisations
Macnab was a member of the following arts organisations:
Royal Institute of Oil Painters, president (at his death in 1967)
Imperial Arts League, chairman
National Society of Painters, Sculptors and Engravers, fellow
Royal Society of Painter-Etchers and Engravers, honorary auditor

Further reading

References

1967 deaths
1890 births
20th-century British printmakers
20th-century Scottish painters
20th-century engravers
Alumni of the Heatherley School of Fine Art
British illustrators
Modern painters
People educated at Merchiston Castle School
People from Iloilo
Scottish engravers
Scottish male painters
Scottish wood engravers
Sibling artists
British Army personnel of World War I
Argyll and Sutherland Highlanders officers
Royal Air Force Volunteer Reserve personnel of World War II
Royal Air Force officers
20th-century Scottish male artists
Alumni of the Glasgow School of Art